Pushpagiri may refer to:
 Pushpagiri Medical College Hospital, a private medical college hospital in Thiruvalla, Kerala, India
 Pushpagiri Vihara, an ancient Buddhist monastery in Odisha, India
 Pushpagiri Wildlife Sanctuary, a wildlife sanctuary in Karnataka, India
 Pushpagiri, a peak in the Pushpagiri Wildlife Sanctuary
 Pushpagiri, Andhra Pradesh, a village in India
 Pushpagiri Temple Complex, located by the village of Pushpagiri